Frank Mellen Nye (March 7, 1852 – November 29, 1935) was a Representative from Minnesota.

Early life and education
born in Shirley, Piscataquis County, Maine; moved to Wisconsin with his parents, who settled on a farm near River Falls, Pierce County, in 1855; attended the common schools and the local academy in River Falls.

Career
He taught school for several years and then studied law; as admitted to the bar in 1878 and commenced practice in Hudson, Wisconsin; district attorney of Polk County, Wisconsin, 1879 – 1884; member of the Wisconsin State Assembly in 1884 and 1885; moved to Minnesota in 1886, settled in Minneapolis, and continued the practice of law; assistant prosecuting attorney of Hennepin County; prosecuting attorney 1893 – 1897; elected as a Republican to the Sixtieth, Sixty-first, and Sixty-second congresses (March 4, 1907 – March 3, 1913); declined to be a candidate for renomination in 1912; resumed the practice of his profession in Minneapolis; elected in 1920 judge of the district court of Hennepin County for a six-year term; reelected in 1926 and served until his retirement in 1932; died in Minneapolis, November 29, 1935; interment in Greenwood Cemetery, River Falls, Wisconsin.

References

External links

Minnesota state court judges
Republican Party members of the Wisconsin State Assembly
1852 births
1935 deaths
People from Piscataquis County, Maine
Politicians from Minneapolis
People from River Falls, Wisconsin
Republican Party members of the United States House of Representatives from Minnesota
Lawyers from Minneapolis